Greg Orton may refer to:

 Greg Orton (wide receiver), wide receiver
 Greg Orton (offensive lineman), offensive lineman